Space environment is a branch of astronautics, aerospace engineering and space physics that seeks to understand and address conditions existing in space that affect the design and operation of spacecraft. A related subject, space weather, deals with dynamic processes in the solar-terrestrial system that can give rise to effects on spacecraft, but that can also affect the atmosphere, ionosphere and geomagnetic field, giving rise to several other kinds of effects on human technologies.

Effects on spacecraft can arise from radiation, space debris and meteoroid impact, upper atmospheric drag and spacecraft electrostatic charging.

Radiation in space usually comes from three main sources:
 The Van Allen radiation belts
 Solar proton events and solar energetic particles; and
 Galactic cosmic rays.
For long-duration missions, the high doses of radiation can damage electronic components and solar cells. A major concern is also radiation-induced "single-event effects" such as single event upset. Crewed missions usually avoid the radiation belts and the International Space Station is at an altitude well below the most severe regions of the radiation belts. During solar energetic events (solar flares and coronal mass ejections) particles can be accelerated to very high energies and can reach the Earth in times as short as 30 minutes (but usually take some hours). These particles are mainly protons and heavier ions that can cause radiation damage, disruption to logic circuits, and even hazards to astronauts. Crewed missions to return to the Moon or to travel to Mars will have to deal with the major problems presented by solar particle events to radiation safety, in addition to the important contribution to doses from the low-level background cosmic rays. In near-Earth orbits, the Earth's geomagnetic field screens spacecraft from a large part of these hazards - a process called geomagnetic shielding.

Space debris and meteoroids can impact spacecraft at high speeds, causing mechanical or electrical damage. The average speed of space debris is  while the average speed of meteoroids is much greater. Mechanical damage from debris impacts have been studied through space missions including LDEF, which had over 20,000 documented impacts through its 5.7-year mission. Electrical anomalies associated with impact events include ESA's Olympus spacecraft, which lost attitude control during the 1993 Perseid meteor shower. A similar event occurred with the Landsat 5 spacecraft during the 2009 Perseid meteor shower.

Spacecraft electrostatic charging is caused by the hot plasma environment around the Earth. The plasma encountered in the region of the geostationary orbit becomes heated during geomagnetic substorms caused by disturbances in the solar wind. "Hot" electrons (with energies in the kilo-electron volt range) collect on surfaces of spacecraft and can establish electrostatic potentials of the order of kilovolts. As a result, discharges can occur and are known to be the source of many spacecraft anomalies.

Solutions devised by scientists and engineers include, but are not limited to, spacecraft shielding, special "hardening" of electronic systems, various collision detection systems. Evaluation of effects during spacecraft design includes application of various models of the environment, including radiation belt models, spacecraft-plasma interaction models and atmospheric models to predict drag effects encountered in lower orbits and during reentry.

The field often overlaps with the disciplines of astrophysics, atmospheric science, space physics, and geophysics, albeit usually with an emphasis on application.

The United States government maintains a Space Weather Prediction Center at Boulder, Colorado.  The Space Weather Prediction Center (SWPC) is part of the National Oceanic and Atmospheric Administration (NOAA).  SWPC is one of the National Weather Service's (NWS) National Centers for Environmental Prediction (NCEP).

Space weather effects on Earth can include ionospheric storms, temporary decreases in ozone densities, disruption to radio communication, to GPS signals and submarine positioning. Some scientists also theorize links between sunspot activity and ice ages.

Space environmentalism 

Space environmentalism is an advocacy that sees space as not devoid of needing regulation and protection, and has gained attention by an increasing number of academics, such as Moriba Jah.

See also 
 Astronautics 
 ECSS standard E-ST-10-04C on Space environment 
 Karman line
 Outer space 
 Space Environment Data System (SEDAT)
 Space Environment Information System (SPENVIS)
 Space climate
 Space science 
 Space weather
 Space weathering
 Space Weather Prediction Center (SWPC)

References

External links 
 Space Environment Technologies (SET)
 Space Weather Center (SWC)
 ESA Space Environment and Effects Analysis Section 
 International Space Environment Service (ISES)

Astronautics
Aerospace engineering
Space physics